Polideportivo Municipal de Manises is a multi-purpose stadium in Manises, Spain.  It is currently used mostly for football matches and was the main stadium of Huracán Valencia from 2011 to 2014.  The stadium holds 1,000 people. It was built in 2003.

External links 
aupaathletic.com Profile
foursquare.com Profile
Huracán Valencia Site Profile 
Soccerway.com Profile
Weltfußballarchiv.com Profile

Football venues in the Valencian Community
Huracán Valencia CF
Buildings and structures in Manises
Multi-purpose stadiums in Spain
Sports venues completed in 2003